Ndeye Awa Diakhaté (born 2 January 1997) is a Senegalese footballer who plays as a forward for French Division 2 Féminine club Le Puy Foot 43 Auvergne and the Senegal women's national team.

Club career
Diakhaté has played for AFA Grand Yoff in Dakar, Senegal and for Le Puy in France.

International career
Diakhaté capped for Senegal at senior level during the 2022 Africa Women Cup of Nations qualification.

International goals

References

External links

1997 births
Living people
Senegalese women's footballers
Women's association football forwards
Women's association football midfielders
Le Puy Foot 43 Auvergne players
Senegal women's international footballers
Senegalese expatriate footballers
Senegalese expatriate sportspeople in France
Expatriate women's footballers in France